Mount McPhail is a mountain located in the Elk Range of the Park Ranges of the Canadian Rockies and stands astride the British Columbia-Alberta border, which follows the Continental Divide in this area. The mountain was named in 1918 after Norman R. McPhail, a Canadian soldier who was killed in action during World War I.

See also
 List of peaks on the Alberta–British Columbia border

References

Two-thousanders of Alberta
Two-thousanders of British Columbia
Borders of British Columbia
Borders of Alberta
Great Divide of North America
Canadian Rockies